Precipice Peak is a  mountain summit located in Hinsdale County, of Colorado, United States. It is situated 10.5 miles northeast of the community of Ouray, in the Uncompahgre Wilderness, on land managed by Uncompahgre National Forest. It is part of the San Juan Mountains which is a subset of the Rocky Mountains, and is situated west of the Continental Divide. Neighbors include Dunsinane Mountain three-quarters of a mile north, Courthouse Mountain 2.4 miles northwest, and Redcliff 2.2 miles south. The mountain's name was officially adopted by the United States Board on Geographic Names in 1966. It is so named because of a very prominent precipice on the mountain's east face.

Climate 
According to the Köppen climate classification system, Precipice Peak is located in an alpine subarctic climate zone with cold, snowy winters, and cool to warm summers. Due to its altitude, it receives precipitation all year, as snow in winter, and as thunderstorms in summer, with a dry period in late spring. Precipitation runoff from the mountain drains into tributaries of the Cimarron River.

Gallery

See also

References

External links 

 Weather forecast: Precipice Peak

Mountains of Hinsdale County, Colorado
San Juan Mountains (Colorado)
Mountains of Colorado
North American 4000 m summits
Uncompahgre National Forest